Bobby Taylor (born March 5, 1941) was a Canadian Football League receiver who played for the Calgary Stampeders, Toronto Argonauts, Hamilton Tiger-Cats, and Edmonton Eskimos.

Bobby attended Clarkson University from 1961-1962.

In his fourteen-year career he caught 521 receptions for a total of 8,203 yards and 50 touchdowns.  Taylor's 56 catches led the CFL in 1968.

He was Toronto's nominee for Most Outstanding Canadian player in 1968 and 1969.

Bobby played minor league hockey, as well, from 1962-1970 in the EHL, WHL, AHL, and CPHL.

Bobby also owns what is commonly held as the oldest running pub in Toronto. The Black Bull Tavern on Queen St. https://tayloronhistory.com/2017/12/15/history-of-torontos-black-bull-tavern/

References 

1941 births
Living people
Calgary Stampeders players
Canadian football wide receivers
Canadian players of Canadian football
English players of Canadian football
Edmonton Elks players
Hamilton Tiger-Cats players
Sportspeople from Barrow-in-Furness
Canadian football people from Toronto
Toronto Argonauts players
English emigrants to Canada